Keisling is a surname. Notable people with the surname include:

Kelly Keisling (born 1951), American politician
Mara Keisling (born 1959), American transgender rights activist
Phil Keisling (born 1955), American businessman and politician